Kure Gana Ibn Abdullahi was a king of Kanem. He was one of the four sons of Abdullahi who lost their lives during the battle with the southern ethnic groups of Lake Chad, sometimes called the Sao.

Rulers of the Kanem Empire